Wien Leopoldau (German for Vienna Leopoldau) is a railway station located in the Floridsdorf district of Vienna, Austria.  Opened in 1912, it is owned and operated by the Austrian Federal Railways (ÖBB), and is served by both regional and S-Bahn trains.

References

Notes

Bibliography

External links 

Leopoldau
Buildings and structures in Floridsdorf
Railway stations opened in 1912
1912 establishments in Austria-Hungary